Khawaja Ahmad Tariq Rahim is a Pakistani politician who has served as the Governor of Punjab, Pakistan. Previously, he also had been the Federal Minister.

Born to Khawaja Abdur Rahim, a prominent civil servant and lawyer, Khawaja received his early education from Aitchison College, Lahore.

References

Living people
Aitchison College alumni
Federal ministers of Pakistan
Governors of Punjab, Pakistan
Mian family
People from Lahore
Punjabi people
Year of birth missing (living people)